The Chatham raven (Corvus moriorum) is a prehistoric raven formerly native to the Chatham Islands (New Zealand). The closely related New Zealand raven, C. antipodum occurred in the North and South Islands of New Zealand. C. antipodum was formerly included in C. moriorum, and later considered a distinct species, however in 2017 genetic research determined that the two raven populations were subspecies rather than separate species, having only split 130,000 years ago.

A reconstruction of the raven is in the Museum of New Zealand Te Papa Tongarewa, specimen MNZ S.036749.

Description and ecology
The Chatham raven was significantly larger than the New Zealand raven, and probably the world's fourth- or fifth-largest passerine. They had long, broad bills that were not as arched as those of some of the Hawaiian crows (C. hawaiiensis). Presumably, they were black all over like all their close relatives. There do not seem to be recorded oral traditions of this sub-species – most of the Moriori people, after whom this sub-species was named, were eventually killed or enslaved by Māori explorers, and little of their natural history knowledge  has been preserved. Thus, it cannot be completely ruled out that like some congeners they had partially white or grey plumage (see also Pied raven).

Remains of Chatham ravens are most common in coastal sites on the Chatham Islands. On the coast, it may have frequented the seal and penguin colonies or fed in the intertidal zone, as does the Tasmanian forest raven (C. tasmanicus). It may also have depended on fruit, like the New Caledonian crow (C. moneduloides), but it is difficult to understand why a fruit eater would have been most common in coastal forest and shrubland when fruit was distributed throughout the forest.

See also
 List of extinct animals of New Zealand
 Late Quaternary prehistoric birds

References

 Gill, B. J. 2003. "Osteometry and systematics of the extinct New Zealand ravens (Aves: Corvidae: Corvus)". Journal of Systematic Palaeontology 1: 43–58.
 Scofield, R. P., Mitchell K.J., Wood, J.R., De Pietri, V.L., Jarvie, S., Llamas, B., Cooper, A., 2017. "The origin and phylogenetic relationships of the New Zealand ravens" in Molecular phylogenetics and evolution, Vol.106, p. 136-143. ; 
 Worthy, T.H., Holdaway R.N., 2002, The Lost World of the Moa: Prehistoric Life of New Zealand, Indiana University Press, Bloomington. .

External links
 Chatham Islands Raven. Corvus moriorum. by Paul Martinson. Artwork produced for the book Extinct Birds of New Zealand, by Alan Tennyson, Te Papa Press, Wellington, 2006

Corvus
Extinct birds of the Chatham Islands
Late Quaternary prehistoric birds
Ravens
Holocene extinctions
Fossil taxa described in 1892